Machair was a Scottish Gaelic television soap opera produced by Scottish Television Enterprises between 6 January 1993 and 6 April 1999.

History

The series was created and developed by Peter May and Janice Hally who was also the storyliner and principal scriptwriter. As there was no history of large-scale television drama output in the Gaelic language, the pair spent two years of preparatory work on the creation of the show. Their initial proposal for Head of Drama at Scottish Television, Robert Love, included details not only of the characters and storylines for the show but details of the process required to find, recruit and train actors and writers. They went on to conduct actors' workshops, screentests, and writing courses to train the talent they had found to a professional standard for television.

Machair was written in English and translated into Gaelic, then given English subtitles and broadcast at peak viewing time. Although the concept was initially greeted with derision by the press, when the show aired it received unanimous praise from reviewers. Kenneth Roy, television critic of Scotland on Sunday, described it as "a credit to the company [Scottish Television] and a smack in the face to those of us who were doubtful" and after a few episodes said "it is even better than it looked at first glance quite simply the best thing to have happened to television in Scotland for a long time". Viewers were in accord with him as it achieved a 30% audience share and made it into the top ten of programmes viewed in Scotland, despite that fewer than 2% of the Scottish population could speak Gaelic. It was nominated for awards for production and writing from The Celtic Film Festival and Writers Guild of Great Britain.

Along with Janice Hally, Ann Marie Di Mambro was a scriptwriter for the series. Among the Gaelic writers employed were Anne Frater, Donald Smith, Iain Finlay Macleod, and Aonghas 'Dubh' MacNeacail. Regular cast members included Simon MacKenzie, Anna Murray, Kenny MacRae, Duncan MacNeil and Tony Kearney.

It was shot entirely on location on the Isle of Lewis in the Outer Hebrides from 1992 to 1996, and after 1996 interior scenes were shot in Studio Alba, which was originally built to accommodate it in Stornoway. The series was funded by the Gaelic Television Committee, and according to government reports, had the effect of creating jobs and boosting the economy in the islands.

The writing and producer team of May and Hally made the first ninety-nine half-hour episodes. After they left, further episodes were made but audience figures dropped and the show was cancelled,

The programme was given a second screening on BBC Alba, the dedicated Scottish Gaelic language digital television channel and is now (from September 2011) being repeated on that channel.

Cast and characters

Episodes
 Series 1: 13eps – 1993
 Series 2: 13eps – 1993
 Series 3: 13eps – 1994
 Series 4: 13eps – 1994
 Series 5: 13eps – 1995
 Series 6: 13eps – 1995
 Series 7: 13eps – 1996
 Series 8: 13eps – 1996
 Series 9: 13eps – 1997
 Series 10: 13eps – 1997
 Series 11: 13eps – 1998
 Series 12: 7eps – 1999

References

External links

1990s Scottish television series
1993 Scottish television series debuts
1999 Scottish television series endings
BBC Alba shows
BBC television dramas
ITV soap operas
Scottish television soap operas
Television shows produced by Scottish Television
BBC Scotland television shows
1990s British television soap operas